MB-3 is a drug which acts as a potent and selective inhibitor of the histone acetyltransferase enzyme GCN5, which usually functions as a negative modulator of PGC-1α, and so MB-3 acts to indirectly activate PGC-1α. It is used in research into the role of the GCN5/PGC-1α pathway in the regulation of metabolism and cell differentiation.

See also 
 HY-124798

References 

Enzyme inhibitors
Vinylidene compounds